Kihaule's mouse shrew (Myosorex kihaulei) is a species of mammal in the family Soricidae endemic to Tanzania where it is known only from the Udzungwa Mountains, at the western end of the Eastern Arc Mountains. Its natural habitats are subtropical or tropical moist montane forests and plantations. It is threatened by habitat destruction and the International Union for Conservation of Nature has assessed its conservation status as being "endangered". It was named after Philip M. Kihaule, a medical-entomological technician, who considerably contributed to the documenting of the small mammals of Tanzania and collected the type specimen of this shrew.

Description
The dorsal fur is dark brown, the individual hairs having brownish-black bases and paler brown tips. The ventral fur is brown, but not such a rich shade as that of the Geata mouse shrew (Myosorex geata), which it otherwise resembles. The tubercles on the hind feet are large and rounded, and the claws are sturdy. The tail is about half the length of the combined head-and-body.

Distribution and habitat
This shrew is endemic to Tanzania, and is only known from the Udzungwa Mountains, one of the ranges of the Eastern Arc Mountains, although some specimens of a species of Myosorex on Mount Rungwe might prove to be M. kihaulei. At one time these mountains were part of a continuous belt of rainforest, but climate changes resulted in the lowland areas between the mountains becoming savannah, and the forest on each mountain range was separated from the neighbouring ranges, resulting in much endemism.

Status
This shrew is a common species in suitable habitats within its range, but it is threatened by deforestation as land is cleared for agricultural production. It is unclear whether it is able to adapt to live in degraded habitats such as secondary forest, although one individual was found in a tea plantation. Because of these factors, the International Union for Conservation of Nature has assessed its conservation status as being "endangered".

References

Myosorex
Mammals of Tanzania
Endemic fauna of Tanzania
Taxonomy articles created by Polbot
Mammals described in 2000